William Fairley was a Scottish professional footballer who played as a wing half.

References

Scottish footballers
Association football wing halves
St Mirren F.C. players
Grimsby Town F.C. players
English Football League players